Jorge Miguel Moreira Larrouy Fernandes (born 6 September 1970), commonly known as Jojó, is a Mozambican retired footballer who played as a right back and also as a right midfielder.

Club career
The son of Portuguese settlers in Mozambique, Jojó began his career with Clube de Desportos da Costa do Sol and Clube Ferroviário de Maputo. In 1992, he returned to the land of his ancestors and signed for Boavista FC, but never appeared officially for the team, also being loaned to U.D. Leiria.

Most of Jojó's Portuguese career was spent in the second division. In 1997–98 he had his first and only Primeira Liga experience, appearing in 24 scoreless matches for C.F. Os Belenenses as the season ended in relegation. In the country, he also represented, in a total of 12 years, A.D. Ovarense, F.C. Penafiel and S.C. Espinho (two of his six campaigns with the latter club were spent in the third level).

In 2005, aged 35, Jojó moved to Australia, closing out his career two years later having represented Fraser Park FC and Bonnyrigg White Eagles FC. He later obtained his UEFA coaching licence, both levels 1 and 2.

International career
Jojó played for the Mozambican national side in the 1996 and 1998 Africa Cup of Nations finals, winning nearly 80 caps in 14 years.

References

External links

1970 births
Living people
Mozambican people of Portuguese descent
Mozambican footballers
Association football defenders
Association football midfielders
CD Costa do Sol players
Clube Ferroviário de Maputo footballers
Primeira Liga players
Liga Portugal 2 players
Segunda Divisão players
Boavista F.C. players
U.D. Leiria players
A.D. Ovarense players
F.C. Penafiel players
C.F. Os Belenenses players
S.C. Espinho players
Bonnyrigg White Eagles FC players
Mozambique international footballers
1996 African Cup of Nations players
1998 African Cup of Nations players
Mozambican expatriate footballers
Expatriate soccer players in Australia
Mozambican expatriate sportspeople in Portugal